Taran may refer to:

Places 
 Tarane, village in northern Lebanon
 Taran, Bulgaria, a village in Smolyan municipality
 Taran, Iran (disambiguation), several places in Iran
 Taran District, the name of a district of Kazakhstan; also, the capital of Taran District
 Taran Plateau, Antarctica

People
 Taran (name), includes people with the given name and surname

Other uses
 Taran, Russian term for aerial ramming in wartime
 A Welsh god, associated with the Gaulish Taranis
 Rutilus heckelii or taran, a species of fish commonly known as roaches
Taran (character), the main character in The Chronicles of Prydain books
 The character appears in Disney's adaption, The Black Cauldron
SU-152 "Taran", a 1965 experimental Russian tank destroyer

See also
 
Taran Taran (disambiguation)
Tarn Taran (disambiguation)
Tarana (disambiguation)
Taranis (disambiguation)